Gavriil Popov may refer to:

Gavriil Popov (composer) (1904–1972), Soviet Russian composer
Gavriil Kharitonovich Popov (born 1936), Russian politician